The Battle of the Aous was fought in 198 BC between the Roman Republic and the Kingdom of Macedon, in the area between modern Tepelenë and Këlcyrë in Albania.  The Roman forces were led by Titus Quinctius Flamininus and the Macedonian ones were led by Philip V.

The Macedonian army encamped behind a pass in an unassailable position. A local shepherd guided the Romans to a secret path that took them behind the Macedonian position. Flaminius led his troops through this secret path and attacked the Macedonians from the rear, rendering their position untenable and inflicting some 2,000 casualties. Philip's army retreated with the survivors, and the two commanders would meet again at Cynoscephalae the following year.

References

198 BC
Aous -198
Aous -198
Aous 198 BC